Toney's Brook is a tributary of the Second River in Essex County, New Jersey in the United States.

Generally thought to be named for Anthony Oliff, a resident of West Orange (Newark in his time), Toney's Brook originates in Montclair northwest of the Upper Montclair railway station (originally north of the Montclair Presby Iris Garden), now with two branches, east and west of the elevated railroad tracks at Bellevue. In Montclair it is joined by two tributary streams, both originally also called Toney's (one called Tunnel Brook, arising from the cliff near Claremont Ave.).  In Montclair, Toney's Brook runs through Anderson Park, Edgemont Memorial Park, Montclair High School and Glenfield Park.  In Glenfield Park, the brook continues southeast into Glen Ridge, where it flows through The Glen (the glen for which that borough is named).  It then flows into Bloomfield and, in Watsessing Park, joins the Second River, a tributary of the Passaic River.  Many roads have been built over the brook and in some places it is covered up completely, canalized or culvertised.

In the 19th and early 20th century, Toney's Brook supported several mills, which produced lumber, beer, calico, brass fittings, and pasteboard boxes.

See also
List of rivers of New Jersey

Bloomfield, New Jersey
Montclair, New Jersey
Tributaries of the Passaic River
Rivers of New Jersey
Rivers of Essex County, New Jersey